Al-Qubayba was a Palestinian Arab village in the Ramle Subdistrict. It was depopulated during the 1948 Arab-Israeli War on May 27, 1948, by the Givati Brigade as part of the Second stage of Operation Barak. It was located 10.5 km southeast of Ramla near the Rubin River (or Wadi al-Sarar) which provided the village with water and irrigation for agriculture. Al-Qubayba was mostly destroyed with the exception of a few houses, and Kfar Gevirol was built in its place, now a suburb in the west of Rehovot.

History
In the late Ottoman era, Pierre Jacotin noted it as an unnamed  village  on his map from 1799.

In 1863, Victor Guérin  found the village to contains four hundred and fifty inhabitants. The houses were grouped together  on a hill, and surrounded by gardens planted with figs, olives, cucumbers, and tobacco.

An Ottoman village list of about 1870  showed Kubebe with a population of 499, in 210 houses,  though the population count included men, only. 

In 1882, the PEF's Survey of Western Palestine described Kubeibeh as "a moderately large village, principally of mud, with cactus hedges surrounding gardens, standing on high ground. There is a well  in the gardens to the east, and another to the south of the village."

British Mandate era
An elementary school for boys  was founded in 1929, and by 1945 it had an enrollment of 344 students. 

In the 1931 census of Palestine, conducted by the British Mandate authorities, El Qubeiba had 799 Muslim inhabitants  in 160 houses.

In the 1945 statistics, the village had a population of 1,720 Muslims,  and the total land area was 10,737 dunams.  Of this, Arabs used 4,639 dunams for citrus and bananas, 1,143 dunums were irrigated or used for orchards, 2,972  dunums were allocated to cereals, while 43 dunams were classified as built-up urban areas.

1948, aftermath
The Israeli settlements of Ge'alya and  Kfar Gevirol were constructed on village land.

In 1992 the village site was described: "The walls and rubble of collapsed houses intermingle with the buildings of the Israeli settlements that have been established on the site. A former pool is used as a garbage dump. Some houses remain. One house, occupied by Jewish residents, is of modest size and is made of masonry; the beams that support its flat roof protrude slightly from the masonry of the exterior walls. Another village house is now used as a restaurant. Part of the school, a long building with a rectangular door and windows, still stands. Cactus hedges and  sycamore and palm trees grow on the southern edge of the site."

References

Bibliography

External links
Welcome to al-Qubayba
al-Qubayba (Ramla), Zochrot
Survey of Western Palestine, Map 16:  IAA,  Wikimedia commons
al-Qubayba at Khalil Sakakini Cultural Center

Arab villages depopulated during the 1948 Arab–Israeli War
District of Ramla